Injeolmi is a variety of tteok, or Korean rice cake, made by steaming and pounding glutinous rice flour, which is shaped into small pieces and usually covered with steamed powdered dried beans or other ingredients.

It is a representative type of glutinous pounded tteok, and has varieties depending on the type of gomul (고물, something to coating rice cake) used. Gomul can be made with powdered dried soybeans, azuki beans, or sesame seeds, or sliced dried jujube. Subsidiary ingredients are mixed into the steamed rice while pounding it on the anban (안반, wooden pounding board). Patinjeolmi (팥인절미), and kkaeinjeolmi (깨인절미) are examples for the former, coated with azuki bean powder and sesame respectively. In ssuk injeolmi (쑥인절미) and surichwi injeolmi (수리취인절미) are artemisia and Synurus deltoides (AIT.) NAKAI) added.

Injeolmi is not only a popular snack but also is considered a high quality tteok, used for janchi (Korean:잔치 ; party, feast, or banquet) in Korea. It is easily digested and nutritious. Injeolmi can be stored in a refrigerator and taken out when needed. If the tteok is heated slightly in the microwave, it may taste almost as good as the newly made one. Office workers sometimes eat injeolmi instead of rice or bread because they have no appetite in the morning and are easily digested when pressed for time.

It is better to use soy beans gomul in summer because it is prone to damage. Red beans gomul(고물) is used a lot in spring, fall, and winter.

The way of making Injeolmis has an important effect on the characteristics of Injeolmis; whether the glutinous rice is Japonica or Japonica/Indica, and whether it is steamed in rice grain, or in rice powder. The characteristics of Injeolmi were investigated through sensory evaluation and Instron Universal testing machine.

Various foods using injeolmi are being released. A chef at Shilla Hotel's Chinese restaurant recently introduced 'Injeolmi Tenderloin Guobaorou'. In addition, the cafe also released beverages and desserts using injeolmi (ex. injeolmi patbingsu-adzuki-bean ice dessert, injeolmi croffle).

Gallery

See also
Tteok
Mochi
Rice cake
 List of steamed foods

References

External links
Injeolmi recipe at Tourism Promotion Division, Seoul Metropolitan Government
Etymology of Injeolmi at Empas / Britannica

Tteok
Steamed foods